Chris Mooney may refer to:

Chris Mooney (aikido) (born 1958), British aikidoka
Chris Mooney (basketball) (born 1972), American college basketball coach
Chris Mooney (journalist) (born 1977), American journalist